South Bastion Mountain is a  peak in British Columbia, Canada. It is part of the Tower of London Range of the Muskwa Ranges in the Canadian Rockies. 

South Bastion Mountain is named after the South Bastion of the Tower of London.
Other mountains in the area are also named after the tower, including North Bastion Mountain, The White Tower and Tower Mountain, which overlooks the south end of Wokkpash Lake.  These names were given by the Royal Fusiliers (City of London Regiment) Canadian Rocky Mountains Expedition 1960, a small expedition with members from a regiment based in the Tower of London.
Other nearby peaks include Angle Peak, Mount Peck, Devereux Peak, and Icecap Peak.

References
Citations

Sources

Two-thousanders of British Columbia
Canadian Rockies
Peace River Land District